Combat archery, sometimes known as battle archery, is a sport similar to dodgeball, paintball or Nerf war played with bows and arrows tipped with foam.

History 
The Archery Tag equipment brand was invented by John Jackson of Waterloo, Indiana in 2011. The sport experienced a boost in popularity from the Hunger Games book and film series, which features a bow-wielding protagonist, and Jackson staged target shooting activities using his patented "non-lethal arrows" at local premieres of the films. By 2014, Jackson had licensed the game to 170 locations, in the United States, UK, The Netherlands, Russia, Singapore, and a number of other countries. Other brands such as Battle Archery, Battle Bows, or Arrow Tag have followed suit with similar formats.

Rules & gameplay 
  

The combat archery sport game play is a combination of 3 other main sports including, dodgeball, paintball, and archery. Participants form teams of 5 and shoot at opponents with large foam tip arrows using a bow.  To avoid injury, participants wear protective face masks and use bows with less than 30lb draw weight.

The game's rules closely resemble dodgeball. The game begins with a number of arrows in the center of the arena. At the whistle, players race to collect them, before firing them at one another across the playing field. A player is eliminated if struck by an arrow, and a player can bring an eliminated teammate back into play by catching an arrow.

References

Archery
Arrow types
Games of physical skill
Team sports
Shooting sports